Baloncesto Villa de Mieres 2012, also known as BVM2012, is a basketball team based in Mieres, Asturias, Spain, that currently plays in Primera División de Baloncesto.

History
Baloncesto Villa de Mieres was founded on January 2, 2012 with local support with the aim to recover the basketball experience in the municipality. In its first season, it only competed with junior and youth teams.

The men's senior team started its way in the 2013–14 season, competing in the Asturian group of Primera División, after achieving a vacant berth in the league. BVM became the champion of the Regional group after winning all the twenty games it played, including the Final of the competition by 85–73 to Grupo Covadonga, and qualified to the promotion playoffs to Liga EBA.

In this stage, played in Ponferrada, BVM successfully promoted by winning its three games.

In June 2016, BVM2012 added to its structure a women's senior team and two futsal teams by integrating the two local clubs in the city (Sena-Nautilus and Racing de Mieres). The new BVM2012-Sena will start playing in Tercera División, the fourth in Spanish futsal.

One year later, BVM2012 announced its resign to continue playing in Liga EBA.

Head coaches
Ángel Fernández Juliá 2013
Arturo Álvarez 2013–2014
Javier Hernández Elizo 2014–2015
José Alberto Rodríguez 2015
Arturo Álvarez 2015–2016
Guillermo Arenas 2016–2017
Jorge García Lorenzo 2017
Vicente Álvarez 2017–2019

Season by season

Honours
'''Asturian Primera División: (1)
2013–14

Notable players
 Jacobo Odriozola

References

External links
Official website 
Profile at Asturcesto 

Basketball teams in Asturias
Liga EBA teams
Basketball teams established in 2012